A general election was held in the United Kingdom on Tuesday, 27 October 1931. Of the 74 seats representing Scotland, 71 seats represented burgh and county constituencies contested under the First-Past-The-Post electoral system, and 3 represented the Combined Scottish Universities multi-member University constituency.

The election saw massive gains for the Unionists across the country, with the party winning nearly 70% of all Scottish seats. The parties forming the National Government together won 64% of the vote, and 86% of the seats. In contrast the Labour Party, which had been the largest party in Scotland following the 1929 general election (where it had won 42% of the Scottish vote), was relegated into fourth place within just two years.

Following the election, with Labour appearing to teeter on the edge of the electoral abyss in Scotland, the Independent Labour Party increasingly moved apart from Labour, ultimately dissociating from the party in March 1932. The ILP had dominated the Labour movement in Scotland since 1918, dominating community based activism, and essentially forming the Labour Party in Scotland. This had ultimately served to undermine the organisational growth of the Labour Party in Scotland.

Results

Burgh & County constituencies

University constituencies

Votes summary

References

General election in Scotland
1930s elections in Scotland
1931
Scotland